Abreu is a Galician-Portuguese surname. 

The source of the name is debated. The family name has a Portuguese form, and has been explained as being an ancient branch of the house of Normandy via the Countship of Évreux, France. It has also been linked to the name Abraham (Portuguese Abraão), the Biblical figure. Some argue that it is an abbreviation of the Portuguese phrase “Abraham the Hebrew” (Portuguese Abraão O Hebreu).

Prominent people with the surname are:
 Abner Abreu (born 1989), Dominican baseball player
Abraham Abreu (born 1939), Venezuelan harpsichordist
 Albert Abreu (born 1995), Dominican Republic professional baseball player
 Alcinda Abreu (born 1953), Mozambican politician
 Aldo Abreu, Venezuelan recorder player
 Aleixo de Abreu (1568–1630), Portuguese physician and tropical pathologist
 Alex Abreu Vásquez (born 1991), Puerto Rican basketball player
Anderson Luís de Abreu Oliveira (born 1988), Brazilian footballer
 Anna Abreu (born 1990), Finnish-Portuguese singer
 António de Abreu (c.1480-c.1514), Portuguese navigator and naval officer
 António Caetano de Abreu Freire Egas Moniz (1874–1955), better known as "António Egas Moniz", Portuguese psychiatrist, neurosurgeon, and Nobel Prize winner
 António Simões de Abreu (born 1947), Portuguese engineer and politician
Artur Abreu (born 1994), Portuguese-Luxembourgish footballer
 Aryam Abreu Delgado (born 1978), Cuban chess Grandmaster
Átila Abreu (born 1987), Brazilian racing driver
 Bobby Abreu (born 1974), Venezuelan baseball player
Bryan Abreu (born 1997), Dominican baseball player
 Caio Fernando Abreu (1948–1996), Brazilian journalist and writer
 Carlos Renato de Abreu (born 1978), Brazilian footballer
 Casimiro de Abreu (1829–1860), Brazilian writer
 Cláudia Abreu (born 1970), Brazilian actress
 Diogo Abreu (born 1947), Portuguese geographer
Diogo Abreu (born 2003), Portuguese footballer
Edgar Abreu (born 1994), Portuguese footballer
 Ermilo Abreu Gómez (1894–1971), Mexican writer
 Eufemio Abreu (1901–?), Cuban baseball player
 Fernanda Abreu (born 1961), Brazilian singer
Fernando Abreu (born 1984), Brazilian footballer
 Florêncio Carlos de Abreu e Silva (1839–1881), Brazilian lawyer, journalist, writer, and politician
 Francisco Abreu (born 1943), Spanish golfer
 George Leandro Abreu de Lima (born 1985), Brazilian footballer
 Gonçalo Abreu (born 1986), Portuguese footballer
 Jesus Gil Abreu (1823–1900), American rancher and pioneer
 Joe Abreu (1913–1993), American baseball player
 José Abreu (1688–1756), Spanish administrator
 José Abreu (born 1910, death date unknown), Cuban baseball player
José Abreu (baseball) (born 1987), Cuban baseball player
 José Antonio Abreu (1939–2018), Venezuelan pianist, economist, educator, activist and politician
 José de Abreu (politician) (1944–2022), Brazilian politician
 José de Abreu (born 1946), Brazilian actor
Juan Abreu (born 1985), Dominican baseball player
 Luciana Abreu (born 1985), Portuguese singer and actress
 Lucile Abreu (1920–1996), American police detective
 Lucy d'Abreu (1892–2005), the oldest living person in the United Kingdom from April 2004 until her death
 Manuel Abreu (1959–2022), French-Portuguese football coach and player.
 Manuel Abreu (born 1977), Uruguayan footballer.
 Manuel de Abreu (1894–1962), Brazilian physician and scientist
 Marco Abreu (born 1974), Angolan footballer
 Marques Batista de Abreu (born 1973), Brazilian footballer
 Marta Abreu (1845–1909), Cuban philanthropist
 Michel Abreu (born 1975), Cuban baseball player
 Miguel Vicente de Abreu (1827-1883), Goan historian
 Norberto Collado Abreu (c.1921-2008), Cuban revolutionary
 Pedro Abreu (born 1957), Cuban basketball player
 Pedro De Abreu (born 1989), Brazilian-American entrepreneur
 Rico Abreu (born 1992), American racing driver
 Santiago Polanco-Abreu (1920–1988), Puerto Rican politician
 Sebastián Abreu (born 1976), Uruguayan footballer
 Tony Abreu (born 1984), Dominican baseball player
 Vânia Abreu (born 1967), Brazilian singer
 Winston Abreu (born 1977), Dominican baseball player
 Xavier Abreu Sierra (born 1950), Mexican politician
 Yudit Abreu (born 1969), Cuban basketball player
 Zequinha de Abreu (1880–1935), Brazilian composer

See also 
 Abreu (disambiguation)
 De  Abrew, Sinhala surname driving from "De Abreu"

References 

Portuguese-language surnames
Jewish surnames
Sephardic surnames

de:Abreu
pt:Abreu (sobrenome)